Robert Manry (June 2, 1918 – February 21, 1971) was a copy editor of the Cleveland Plain Dealer who in 1965 sailed from Falmouth, Massachusetts, to Falmouth, Cornwall, England, in a tiny  sailboat (an Old Town "Whitecap" built by the Old Town Canoe Co. of Old Town, Maine, which he had extensively modified for the voyage) named Tinkerbelle. Beginning on June 1, 1965, and ending on August 17, the voyage lasted 78 days.

At the time, Tinkerbelle was the shortest but not the smallest boat to make a non-stop trip across the Atlantic Ocean (till today the smallest is Lindemann's folding kayak). Manry later wrote about the voyage and its preparation in his book Tinkerbelle, in which the sailor expressed shock and surprise at the huge crowds and armada of small boats that greeted his arrival in Cornwall.

After completing his voyage on Tinkerbelle, Robert purchased Curlew, a 1967 Tartan 27 Yawl. He then set out with his wife, son, daughter, German shepherd, and cat on a cruise from Cleveland, Ohio through the Great Lakes, down, the Mississippi river, through the Gulf to the Bahamas, up the east coast of the US and ultimately back to Cleveland.

Manry died February 21, 1971, from a heart attack in Union City, Pennsylvania.

A small park in Willowick, Ohio—the town where he lived before his journey—is named after him. Tinkerbelle is on display at The Western Reserve Historical Society in Cleveland, Ohio.

Bibliography
 Manry, Robert. Tinkerbelle. New York: Harper & Row, 1967.
 Manry, Robert. Tinkerbelle. London: Collins, 1967.

References

External links
The Robert Manry Project
WEWS reporter Bill Jorgenson interviews Manry aboard Tinkerbelle in 1965: , 
"Tinkerbelle" Land Ho! 1965 Film clip dated 19 August 1965 www.britishpathe.com
Cleveland Memory Project

1918 births
1971 deaths
American sailors
Antioch College alumni
Writers from Cleveland
People from Dehradun district
Single-handed sailors
20th-century American writers
20th-century American male writers
People from Willowick, Ohio